Xingyang railway station is a railway station of Longhai railway located in Xingyang, Zhengzhou, Henan, China.

The station is currently out of passenger services.

History 
The station was opened in 1907.

References 

Railway stations in Henan
Railway stations in Zhengzhou
Stations on the Longhai Railway
Railway stations in China opened in 1907